Sir Leslie Stephen  (28 November 1832 – 22 February 1904) was an English author, critic, historian, biographer, mountaineer, and an early humanist activist. He was also the father of Virginia Woolf and Vanessa Bell.

Life

Sir Leslie Stephen came from a distinguished intellectual family, and was born at 14 (later renumbered 42) Hyde Park Gate, Kensington in London, the son of Sir James Stephen and (Lady) Jane Catherine (née Venn) Stephen. His father was Colonial Undersecretary of State and a noted abolitionist. He was the fourth of five children, his siblings including James Fitzjames Stephen (1829–1894) and Caroline Emelia Stephen (1834–1909).

His family had belonged to the Clapham Sect, the early 19th century group of mainly evangelical Christian social reformers. At his father's house he saw a good deal of the Macaulays, James Spedding, Sir Henry Taylor and Nassau Senior. Leslie Stephen was educated at Eton College, King's College London and Trinity Hall, Cambridge, where he graduated B.A. (20th wrangler) in 1854 and M.A. in 1857. He was elected a fellow of Trinity Hall in 1854 and became a junior tutor in 1856. 

In 1859 he was ordained but his study of philosophy, together with the religious controversies surrounding the publication of On the Origin of Species (1859) by Charles Darwin, caused him to lose his faith in 1862, and in 1864 he resigned from his positions at Cambridge, and moved to London. He recounted some of his experiences in a chapter in his Life of Fawcett as well as in some less formal Sketches from Cambridge: By a Don (1865). These sketches were reprinted from The Pall Mall Gazette, to the proprietor of which, George Murray Smith, he had been introduced by his brother.

Marriage

(1) Harriet (Minny) Thackeray 1867–1875

The family connections included that of William Makepeace Thackeray. His brother, Fitzjames had been a friend of Thackeray's and assisted in the disposition of his estate when he died in 1863. His sister Caroline met Thackeray's daughters, Anny (1837–1919) and Minny (1840–1875) when they were mutual guests of Julia Margaret Cameron (of whom, see later). This led to an invitation to visit from Leslie Stephen's mother, Lady Stephen, where the sisters met him. They also met at George Murray Smith's house at Hampstead. Minny and Leslie became engaged on 4 December 1866 and married on 19 June 1867. 

After the wedding they travelled to the Swiss Alps and Northern Italy, and on return to England lived at the Thackeray sisters' home at 16 Onslow Gardens with Anny, who was a novelist. In the spring of 1868 Minny miscarried but recovered sufficiently for the couple to tour the eastern United States. Minny miscarried again in 1869, but became pregnant again in 1870 and on 7 December gave birth to their daughter, Laura Makepeace Stephen (1870–1945). Laura was premature, weighing three pounds. In March 1873, Thackeray and the Stephens moved to 8 Southwell Gardens. The couple travelled extensively, and by 1875 Minny was pregnant again, but this time was in poor health. On 27 November she developed convulsions, and died the following day of eclampsia.

After Minny's death, Leslie Stephen continued to live with Anny, but they moved to 11 Hyde Park Gate South in 1876, next door to her widowed friend and collaborator, Julia Duckworth. Leslie Stephen and his daughter were also cared for by his sister, the writer Caroline Emelia Stephen, although Leslie described her as "Silly Milly" and her books as "little works". Meanwhile, Anny was falling in love with her younger cousin Richmond Ritchie, to Leslie Stephen's consternation. Ritchie became a constant visitor and they became engaged in May 1877, and were married on 2 August. At the same time Leslie Stephen was seeing more and more of Julia Duckworth.

(2) Julia Duckworth 1878–1895

His second marriage was to Julia Prinsep Duckworth (née Jackson, 1846–1895). Julia had been born in India and after returning to England she became a model for Pre-Raphaelite painters such as Edward Burne-Jones. In 1867 she had married Herbert Duckworth (1833 − 1870) by whom  she had three children prior to his death in 1870.

Leslie Stephen and Julia Duckworth were married on 26 March 1878. They had four children:
 Vanessa (1879–1961), who married Clive Bell
 Thoby (1880–1906)
 Virginia (1882–1941), who married Leonard Woolf
 Adrian (1883–1948)

In May 1895, Julia died of influenza, leaving her husband with four young children aged 11 to 15 (her children by her first marriage being adult by then).

Career

In the 1850s, Stephen and his brother James Fitzjames Stephen were invited by Frederick Denison Maurice to lecture at The Working Men's College. Leslie Stephen became a member of the college's governing College Corporation.

Stephen was an honorary fellow of Trinity Hall, Cambridge, and received the honorary degree Doctor of Letters (D.Litt.) from the University of Cambridge and from the University of Oxford (November 1901).
While at Cambridge, Stephen became an Anglican clergyman. In 1865, having renounced his religious beliefs, and after a visit to the United States two years earlier, where he had formed lasting friendships with Oliver Wendell Holmes Jr., James Russell Lowell and Charles Eliot Norton, he settled in London and became a journalist, eventually editing The Cornhill Magazine in 1871 where R. L. Stevenson, Thomas Hardy, W. E. Norris, Henry James, and James Payn figured among his contributors.

In his spare time, he participated in athletics and mountaineering. He also contributed to the Saturday Review, Fraser, Macmillan, the Fortnightly, and other periodicals. He was already known as a climber, as a contributor to Peaks, Passes and Glaciers (1862), and as one of the earliest presidents of the Alpine Club, when, in 1871, in commemoration of his own first ascents in the Alps, he published The Playground of Europe, which immediately became a mountaineering classic, drawing—together with Whymper's Scrambles Amongst the Alps—successive generations of its readers to the Alps.

During the eleven years of his editorship, in addition to three volumes of critical studies, he made two valuable contributions to philosophical history and theory. The first was The History of English Thought in the Eighteenth Century (1876 and 1881). This work was generally recognised as an important addition to philosophical literature and led immediately to Stephen's election at the Athenaeum Club in 1877. The second was The Science of Ethics (1882). It was extensively adopted as a textbook on the subject and made him the best-known proponent of evolutionary ethics in late-nineteenth-century Britain.  He was elected a member of the American Antiquarian Society in 1901.

Stephen also served as the first editor (1885–91) of the Dictionary of National Biography.

He was appointed a Knight Commander of the Order of the Bath (KCB) in the 1902 Coronation Honours list published on 26 June 1902.

Humanism 

As an adult, Stephen was an agnostic atheist who wrote extensively about his views. In Social Rights and Duties, he explained how he came to lose his faith of his parents: "When I ceased to accept the teaching of my youth, it was not so much a process of giving up beliefs as of discovering that I never really believed." His second wife, Julia, was similarly activist in her writings on agnosticism.

He advocated for more people of this view to claim the label "agnostic" for themselves, eschewing the harder associations of the unadorned term "atheist", reflecting the fact that no one who claims a disbelief in gods does so on the basis of professing absolute knowledge about the universe. He concluded his essay "An Agnostic's Apology" with a reply to religious critics who hold atheists and agnostics in contempt:

Stephen was very involved in the organised humanist movement, even serving multiple terms as President of the West London Ethical Society (part of the Union of Ethical Societies, which became Humanists UK). He gave numerous addresses and lectures to the ethical society during his tenure as president, which are collected at length across multiple volumes of humanist writing. He was an active organiser in the movement, and in one lecture, entitled "The aims of ethical societies", set about the task of defining the broader social purpose which animated the wider Ethical movement at that time.

Mountaineering 

Stephen was one of the most prominent figures in the golden age of alpinism (the period between Wills's ascent of the Wetterhorn in 1854 and Whymper's ascent of the Matterhorn in 1865) during which many major alpine peaks saw their first ascents. Joining the Alpine Club in 1857 (the year of its formation), Stephen made the first ascent, usually in the company of his favourite Swiss guide Melchior Anderegg, of the following peaks:
Wildstrubel – 11 September 1858 with T. W. Hinchliff and Melchior Anderegg
Bietschhorn – 13 August 1859 with Anton Siegen, Johann Siegen and Joseph Ebener
Rimpfischhorn – 9 September 1859 with Robert Living, Melchior Anderegg and Johann Zumtaugwald
Alphubel – 9 August 1860 with T. W. Hinchliff, Melchior Anderegg and Peter Perren
Blüemlisalphorn – 27 August 1860 with Robert Living, Melchior Anderegg, F. Ogi, P. Simond and J. K. Stone
Schreckhorn – 16 August 1861 with Ulrich Kaufmann, Christian Michel and Peter Michel
Monte Disgrazia – 23 August 1862 with E. S. Kennedy, Thomas Cox and Melchior Anderegg
Zinalrothorn – 22 August 1864 with Florence Crauford Grove, Jakob Anderegg and Melchior Anderegg
Mont Mallet – 4 September 1871 with G. Loppe, F. A. Wallroth, Melchior Anderegg, Ch. and A. Tournier

He was President of the Alpine Club from 1865 to 1868 and edited the Alpine Journal, 1868–1872.

List of selected publications 

 The Poll Degree from a Third Point of View (1863).
 The "Times" on the American War: A Historical Study (1865).
 Sketches from Cambridge (1865).
 The Playground of Europe (1871).
 Essays on Free Thinking and Plain Speaking (1873).
 Hours in a Library (3 vols., 1874–1879).
 The History of English Thought in the Eighteenth Century (2 vols., 1876).
 Samuel Johnson (1878).
 Swift (1882).
 The Science of Ethics (1882).
 Life of Henry Fawcett (1885).
 An Agnostic's Apology and Other Essays (London: Smith, Elder and Company, 1893).
 Sir Victor Brooke, Sportsman and Naturalist (1894).
 The Life of Sir James Fitzjames Stephen, Bart., K.C.S.I. (1895).
 Social Rights and Duties (1896).
 Studies of a Biographer (4 volumes, 1898–1902).
 The English Utilitarians (1900).
 George Eliot (London: Macmillan, 1902).
 English Literature and Society in the Eighteenth Century (Ford Lectures) (London: Duckworth and Company, 1903, 1904).
 Hobbes (1904).

Death 

He died in Kensington and is buried in the eastern section of Highgate Cemetery in the raised section alongside the northern path. His daughter, Virginia Woolf, was badly affected by his death and she was cared for by his sister, Caroline. Woolf
in 1927 created a detailed psychological portrait of him in the fictional character of Mr. Ramsay in her classic novel, 
To the Lighthouse, (as well as of her mother as Mrs. Ramsay). (Ref: The Diaries and Letters of Virginia Woolf) His probate is worded: STEPHEN sir Leslie of 22 Hyde Park-gate Middlesex K.C.B. probate London 23 March to George Herbert Duckworth and Gerald de L'Etang Duckworth esquires Effects £15715 6s. 6d.

To honour his memory, his friends held a lecture in 1907 at the University of Cambridge, which has been held bi-annually as the Leslie Stephen Lecture since. His friends endowed that it be held with the specification that it be on "some literary subject, including therein criticism, biography and ethics."

Family tree 

For family trees of the Stephens, Thackerays and Jacksons, see Bicknell (1996a) and Bloom and Maynard (1994).

|

References

Bibliography 

 
 
 
 
 
 
 Harrison, Frederic (1908). "Sir Leslie Stephen." In: Realities and Ideals. London: Macmillan & Co.
 Hutton, Richard Holt (1908). "Mr. Leslie Stephen and the Scepticism of Believers." In: Criticism on Contemporary Thought and Thinkers. London: Macmillan and Co.
 
 
 
 
 
  (see also Dictionary of National Biography)
  also Internet archive

Websites
 
  Family tree
 
 
 Virginia Woolf (1922). "To the Lighthouse"

Anne Thackeray Ritchie

External links

 
 
 
 History of English Thought in the Eighteenth Century at Internet Archive.
 Obituary
 Leslie Stephen Photograph Album, Mortimer Rare Book Collection, Smith College Special Collections

External images 
 Leslie and Harriet Stephen 1867, in 
 Julia Prinsep Jackson, c.1856,  in 

1832 births
1904 deaths
English mountain climbers
English biographers
Dictionary of National Biography
People educated at Eton College
Stephen-Bell family
English agnostics
English essayists
English humanists
19th-century English historians
Alumni of Trinity Hall, Cambridge
Presidents of the Alpine Club (UK)
Virginia Woolf
Alumni of King's College London
20th-century biographers
Fellows of the British Academy
Members of the American Antiquarian Society
19th-century English writers
Burials at Highgate Cemetery
Women biographers
20th-century English historians